Kerteh (est. pop. (2000 census): 3,064) is a mukim in Kemaman District, Terengganu, Malaysia.

Economy
Kerteh is the base of operations for Petronas in Terengganu, overseeing the oil platform operations off the state's coast as well as petrochemicals production, natural gas processing and crude oil refining.

Tourist attractions
The Ma'Daerah turtle sanctuary is also nearby. During the night, the lights from the oil and gas processing plant make a beautiful view which gives Kerteh the nickname 'City of Light'.

Transportation
Kerteh is served by the Kerteh Airport, a small airport catering mostly to helicopter flights to offshore oil platforms and charter plane flights for Petronas staff to Sultan Abdul Aziz Shah Airport near Kuala Lumpur.

References

External links
 Kerteh Hash House Harriers
 Ma'Daerah Turtle Sanctuary

Kemaman District
Mukims of Terengganu